The Mountain of the National Emblem is a landmark in the Ali Sabieh region of Djibouti. The national emblem of Djibouti is carved into the mountain. It overlooks Ali Sabieh and is a local landmark. The Mountain of the National Emblem is the region's top tourist attraction.

History

In 1945, the colonial French authorities erected a sign on the mountain featuring the Cross of Lorraine symbol. It was later removed following Djibouti's independence in 1977, with the national emblem of Djibouti symbol erected in its place.

Mountains of Djibouti